Calliotropis bucina is a species of sea snail, a marine gastropod mollusk in the family Eucyclidae.

Description
The shell can grow to be 5.5 mm in length.

Distribution
This marine species occurs in the Mozambique Channel and off the French island of Réunion.

References

 Vilvens C. (2007) New records and new species of Calliotropis from Indo-Pacific. Novapex 8 (Hors Série 5): 1–72

External links

bucina
Gastropods described in 2006